German submarine U-435 was a Type VIIC U-boat built for Nazi Germany's Kriegsmarine for service during World War II.
She was laid down on 11 April 1940 by F Schichau GmbH in Danzig as yard number 1477, launched on 31 May 1941 and commissioned on 30 August 1941 under Korvettenkapitän Siegfried Strelow (Knight's Cross).

The boat's service began on 30 August 1941 with training as part of the 5th U-boat Flotilla. She was transferred to the 1st flotilla on 1 January 1942 for active service and then to the 11th flotilla on 1 July 1942. She returned to the 1st flotilla on 1 February 1943.

Design
German Type VIIC submarines were preceded by the shorter Type VIIB submarines. U-435 had a displacement of  when at the surface and  while submerged. She had two shafts and two  propellers.

U-435 was fitted with five  torpedo tubes (four fitted at the bow and one at the stern), fourteen torpedoes, one  SK C/35 naval gun, 220 rounds, and a  C/30 anti-aircraft gun. The boat had a complement of between forty-four and sixty.

Service history

Convoy PQ 13
 attacked and damaged the American freighter Effingham straggling the convoy. U-435 then finished off the abandoned vessel.

Convoy QP 10
U-435 was more successful in April sinking both the Panamanian freighter El Occidente and British steamer Harpalion. The straggler Harpalion was finished off after being abandoned having been previously heavily damaged by Luftwaffe Ju 88 dive bombers.

Convoy QP 14
U-435 had even more success when she was part of a combined attack on Arctic Convoy QP 14. She sank 4 vessels, comprising the minesweeper , RFA fleet oiler Gray Ranger, British Liberty ship Ocean Voice and American freighter Bellingham.

Convoy ONS 154
U-435 continued her earlier successes sinking 3 vessels from ONS 154, the CAM ship Empire Shackleton, the freighter Norse King, the special service vessel : She was also credited with two landing craft carried on Fidelity when she was sunk.

Wolfpacks
She took part in eleven wolfpacks, namely:
Hecht (27 January – 4 February 1942)
Umbau (4 – 16 February 1942)
Eiswolf (28 – 31 March 1942)
Robbenschlag (7 – 13 April 1942)
Nebelkönig (27 July – 14 August 1942)
Ungestüm (11 – 30 December 1942)
Burggraf (24 February – 5 March 1943)
Raubgraf (7 – 19 March 1943)
Trutz (1 – 16 June 1943)
Trutz 3 (16 – 29 June 1942)
Geier 2 (30 June – 9 July 1943)

Fate

Summary of raiding history

References

Notes

Citations

Bibliography

External links

Ships lost with all hands
German Type VIIC submarines
1941 ships
U-boats commissioned in 1941
U-boats sunk in 1943
U-boats sunk by British aircraft
World War II submarines of Germany
World War II shipwrecks in the Atlantic Ocean
Ships built in Danzig
Maritime incidents in July 1943
Ships built by Schichau